The 2022–23 Washington State Cougars women's basketball team represented Washington State University during the 2022–23 NCAA Division I women's basketball season. The Cougars are led by fifth-year head coach Kamie Ethridge and they played their home games at Beasley Coliseum as members of the Pac-12 Conference.

Previous season
Last season, the Cougars finished with an overall record of 19–11. The Cougars finished conference play with a 11–6 record. As the #3 seed in the tournament, the Cougars lost to the #6 seed Utah in the quarterfinals. The Cougars received an at large bid to the 2022 NCAA Division I women's basketball tournament. They received the #8 seed in the Bridgeport Regional. They lost in the first round to the #9 seed South Florida and were eliminated.

Offseason

Departures

Recruiting
There were no recruiting classing class of 2022.

Recruiting class of 2023

Roster

Schedule

|-
!colspan=9 style=| Exhibition

|-
!colspan=9 style=| Regular Season

|-
!colspan=9 style=| Pac-12 Women's Tournament

|-
!colspan=9 style=| NCAA Women's Tournament

Source:

Rankings

*The preseason and week 1 polls were the same.^Coaches did not release a week 2 poll.

See also
 2022–23 Washington State Cougars men's basketball team

Notes

References

Washington State Cougars women's basketball seasons
Washington State
Washington State Cougars women's basketball team
Washington State Cougars women's basketball team
Washington State